State Route 245 (SR 245) is an  long north-south state highway in southern Middle Tennessee. It connects the community of Campbellsville with the city of Columbia.

Route description

SR 245 begins as Yokley Creek Road in Giles County at an intersection with SR 166 just north of Campbellsville. It winds its way north through hilly terrain for several miles to cross into Maury County, becoming Campbellsville Pike, before passing through farmland. The highway then enters the city of Columbia and winds its way northeast through neighborhoods before coming to an end at an intersection with SR 50. The entire route of SR 245 is a two-lane highway.

Major intersections

References

245
Transportation in Giles County, Tennessee
Transportation in Maury County, Tennessee
Columbia, Tennessee